A fakir or faqir is a Sufi who performs feats of endurance or apparent magic.

It may also refer to:

People 
 Fakir (name), including a list of people with that name
 Faqir (clan), an ethnic community found in North India
 Faqir (given name), including a list of people with that name

Places 
Fakir Mohan University, state university in Balasore, India
 Faqir Mosque, 15th-century mosque in Chittagong, Bangladesh
 Faqir Turko Mangrio railway station, railway station in Sindh, Pakistan
 Faqirwali, town in Punjab, Pakistan